is an animator and character designer. Some of her major character designs were for anime shows To Heart, Figure 17, Planetes, and Sacred Seven. In animation direction, she worked on I Dream of Mimi, Berserk, Code Geass, To Heart and Steel Angel Kurumi Zero.

Works

References

External links
 

Sunrise (company) people
Japanese animators
Japanese women animators
Anime character designers
People from Kumamoto Prefecture
1967 births
Living people